

Time's Mirror is a 1999 big band album by jazz trumpeter, composer and arranger, Tom Harrell. In 2000 Harrell received a Grammy nomination for this album in category Best Large Jazz Ensemble Performance. Several of the tracks were originally composed by Harrell in the 1960s and are arranged for big band, recorded and released for the first time on this album. According to All About Jazz, this album is Harrell's "first full-fledged recording as a big-band impresario". AllMusic highly recommended the album, stating that several tracks are candidates to become jazz standards. The album charted at #16 on the Billboard Top Jazz Albums Chart.

Track listing

Personnel
Credits adapted from AllMusic.
 Tom Harrell – flugelhorn, trumpet
 Earl Gardner – flugelhorn, trumpet
 Joe Magnarelli – flugelhorn, trumpet
 Chris Rogers – flugelhorn, trumpet
 David Weiss – flugelhorn, trumpet
 James Zollar – flugelhorn, trumpet
 Mike Fahn – trombone
 Conrad Herwig – trombone
 Curtis Hasselbring – trombone
 Douglas Purviance – trombone, bass trombone
 Craig Bailey – flute, alto saxophone
 Mark Gross – alto saxophone
 Alex Foster – flute, tenor saxophone
 Don Braden – tenor saxophone
 David Schumacher – baritone saxophone
 Xavier Davis – piano
 Kenny Davis – bass
 Carl Allen – drums
 Bob Belden – producer

References

External links 
Tom Harrell, Official Website 

1999 albums
Tom Harrell albums
RCA Records albums